John Farmer Healy CBE (1900−1973) was a Jamaican-born Roman Catholic prelate who served as the Bishop of Gibraltar from 1956 to 1973.

Born in Kingston, Jamaica on 3 December 1900, he was ordained to the priesthood on 11 June 1927. He was appointed the Bishop of the Diocese of Gibraltar by Pope Pius XII on 18 July 1956. His consecration to the Episcopate took place on 11 October 1956; the principal consecrator was the Most Reverend Gerald O'Hara, Bishop of Savannah, Georgia, USA, with the Right Reverend Cyril Cowderoy, Archbishop of Southwark, England and the Right Reverend John Petit, Bishop of Menevia, Wales, serving as co-consecrators. Bishop Healy participated in all the four sessions of the Second Vatican Council, held between in 1962 and 1965.

He died in office on 17 February 1973, aged 72.

References

1900 births
1973 deaths
20th-century Roman Catholic bishops of Gibraltar
Roman Catholic bishops of Kingston in Jamaica
Jamaican Roman Catholic priests
Participants in the Second Vatican Council
Commanders of the Order of the British Empire